Little Ann is an English hamlet attached to Abbotts Ann, approximately two miles south-west of Andover in the north-west of Hampshire.

The Poplar Farm Inn is situated in the hamlet, and is part of the Vintage Inns chain, a trading name of Mitchells & Butlers.

References 

Villages in Hampshire